The Afrikaanse Protestantse Kerk (APK; Afrikaans Protestant Church), also known as AP Kerk, is a South African conservative Reformed Church federation with about 35,000 adherents. The federation consists of 210-240 congregations, mostly in South Africa, although the APK also includes 7 congregations in Namibia and one in London, England.

Formation
In 1982 the World Alliance of Reformed Churches' General Council declared apartheid to be a sin and its theological justification a heresy, in the process expelling from its membership the Nederduits Gereformeerde Kerk (NGK), the major branch of the Dutch Reformed Church (DRC) in South Africa and the traditional mother church of South Africa's Afrikaner population. The shock of this isolation from other branches of the Reformed Churches worldwide led to the adoption in 1986 of the Belhar Confession by some branches of the DRC; the NGK, while stopping short of adopting the Belhar Confession, retracted its 1976 defence of apartheid as a biblical imperative, instead releasing a "more nuanced" document called Church and Society that provided "qualified support for separate development."

However, the document "reflected the new majority consensus within the NGK which rejected the older, Kuyperian theology" and thus outraged the more conservative clergy within the NGK: as a "direct result" the Afrikaanse Protestantse Kerk was founded in Pretoria on Saturday, 27 June 1987 by 3000 dissidents, together with conservative elements from other branches of the DRC in South Africa.

Members of the APK also cited the influence of Arminian and liberal theology in the NGK as a reason to split off. The new church opposed the use of the 1983 Afrikaans Bible translation during worship services, preferring to use older translations. The APK opposed reforms it considered as modernist and sought to preserve traditional Calvinism.

Growth
In 1988 the APK set up a seminary so its pastors could be trained independently, the Afrikaanse Protestantse Akademie, which is based in Pretoria.

In 1990 Church and Society was revised by the NGK to indicate that "any attempt by a church to try to defend a system of separation, biblically and ethically must be seen as a serious errancy; that is to say, it is in conflict with the Bible." From the APK's point of view that was not acceptable; it continued its support of apartheid.  The decision of the NGK widened the schism and led to an increase in conservative NGK congregations that joined the APK.

Theology
The Church holds to the Bible as the infallible Word of God and the sole authority in all matters of faith. Like most offshoots of the DRC, the APK focuses its theology around the Three Forms of Unity and is Calvinist in doctrine. It believes the biblical faith to be accurately summarised in the ecumenical confessions (the Apostles' Creed, the Nicene Creed, the Athanasian Creed), the Belgic Confession, the Heidelberg Catechism and the Canons of Dordt.

The church also holds to the traditional, pre-1986 views of the DRC in that it believes that the Bible not only condones, but actively prescribes, racial segregation.  Its foundation in 1987 was precisely to uphold the traditional, racist theology of the DRC.  It thus does not consider the 1986 Belhar Confession as a creed of the church.  This belief is traditionally justified on their interpretation of God's commandment to the Israelites in the Old Testament to separate themselves from the heathen nations.

Motto
The church's official motto is lig in duisternis (meaning light in the darkness) from 1 John 2:9-11 

and also from John 12:35–36:

Church Publications
Die Boodskapper

Basuingeklank

Redakteursforum

7-Voor-7

Lig in Duisternis Produksies

References

External links 

Protestantism in South Africa
Reformed denominations in Africa
1987 establishments in South Africa
Calvinist denominations established in the 20th century
Christian organizations established in 1987